Seila adamsii is a species of minute sea snail, a marine gastropod mollusc or micromollusc in the family Cerithiopsidae.

Description 
The maximum recorded shell length is 13 mm.

Habitat 
Minimum recorded depth is 0 m. Maximum recorded depth is 80 m.

References

Cerithiopsidae
Gastropods described in 1845